Morley Saint Botolph is a village and former civil parish, now in the parish of Morley, in the South Norfolk district, in the county of Norfolk, England. It is situated 4 km south-west of the town of Wymondham and 23 km south-west of the city of Norwich. The village name is normally abbreviated to "Morley St Botolph". In 1931 the parish had a population of 204. 

Morley Saint Botolph has a sister village, Morley Saint Peter, although the two are often simply referred to as "Morley". The names Morley St. Botolph and Morley St. Peter are first attested on the Ordnance Survey map of 1838.

History 
The villages name means 'Moor wood/clearing'. 'St. Botolph' after the dedication of the church.

Morley St Botolph played a small part in the early stages of Kett's rebellion of 1549, when the townspeople of Wymondham attacked and broke down enclosures in the village.

On 1 April 1935 the parish was abolished and merged with Morley St Peter to form "Morley".

References

External links
 Kelly's Directory of Norfolk, 1896 treats St Botolph as a different parish from St Peter

External links

Villages in Norfolk
South Norfolk